Sebastian Dunn is a British film, television and stage actor who is also a writer and director. He has appeared in Trial & Retribution, Casualty, The Other Half and more recently in CW's Arrow as Eddie Fyers.

He has also performed in stage productions, including John Webster's play "The White Devil" in Leicester, England.

He speaks fluent Spanish, French and Portuguese, and his other skills include fencing and horseback riding.

External links
AP Watt - Sebastian Dunn
Holby.tv - Sebastian Dunn
PFD - Sebastian Dunn

References

Year of birth missing (living people)
Living people
British male television actors